Mahdaviat is a religious term in Shia Islam translating to "Mahdiism" or "belief in the Mahdi". It may refer to
Mahdiism in Islam in general
the Mahdavia ("Mahdiist") sect established in India in the 16th century

See also
People claiming to be the Mahdi
Mahdavi